Uggerby Å (Uggerby River) - a river in northern Denmark (the chief river in Vendsyssel). It rises in Sterup (south of Hjørring) and empties into Skagerrak. In the river, there is a large stock of sea trout, brook trout, eel, shellfish and pike. The association has approx. 50 km fishing right by the river.

References

Rivers of Jutland